Luis Tijerina Almaguer (born 21 August, 1897) was a Mexican educator, civil servant, writer, poet, and politician.

References

Further reading

External links

Fuente Monterrey: 50 años de historia
Luis Tijerina Almaguer
Profr. Luis Tijerina Almaguer

Mexican political people
Mexican poets

1897 births
1978 deaths